USS Cormorant (MHC-57) is the seventh ship of s.

Current Status 
She was transferred to a Naval Inactive Ships Storage Facility in Texas to await transfer under Foreign Military Sales. This sale never happened. She was stricken from the Navy list on 1 December 2007. She was sold by U.S. General Services Administration for scrap on 8 May 2014.

References

 

Ships built in Mississippi
1995 ships
Osprey-class coastal minehunters